The Village Sessions is an EP released by artist John Mayer on December 12, 2006. Collaborators include John Mayer Trio members Steve Jordan and Pino Palladino, along with Ben Harper, Robbie McIntosh, and Ricky Peterson of Mayer's touring band and former producer for Prince albums. The six-song EP contains acoustic and alternate versions of songs found on Mayer's third studio album, Continuum, and his trio's live album, Try!. Mayer co-produced the album with engineer Chad Franscoviak.

Though the EP was released at about the same time as Mayer’s single, "Gravity", the song itself does not appear on this EP, much like Mayer's singles "Daughters" and "Bigger Than My Body" were not on his live album, As/Is, despite being the current singles at the time of its release. Like the As/Is series before it, The Village Sessions was made available on iTunes, on May 15, 2007.

Release

Originally, the EP was only available at indie record stores and at the online Aware Records store in limited quantities. The album was released on December 12, 2006, and copies had sold out on the Aware Store as of December 23, 2006. However, it is now also available on Amazon.com. In May 2007, The Village Sessions was released on iTunes with a special video featuring the making of "In Repair" as heard on Continuum. The video shows the song being recorded within one day.

On December 6, 2007, the acoustic version of "Belief" from "The Village Sessions" was nominated for a Grammy Award in the category of Best Male Pop Vocal Performance, a category that Mayer had previously won three times.

Track listing
 "Waiting on the World to Change" (Ben Harper version)
 "Belief" (acoustic version)
 "Slow Dancing in a Burning Room" (acoustic version)
 "Good Love is On the Way" (acoustic version)
 "I'm Gonna Find Another You" (acoustic version)
 "In Repair" (acoustic version)

Personnel

Musicians
 John Mayer – vocals, guitar
 Robbie McIntosh – guitar 
 Ben Harper – vocals 
 Steve Jordan – percussion 
 Pino Palladino – bass 
 Ricky Peterson – keyboards 

Technical Personnel
 John Mayer – producer
 Chad Franscoviak – producer , engineer
 Dave O'Donnell – mixing 
 Manny Marroquin – mixing 
 Jared Robbins – mix assistant

References

John Mayer EPs
2006 EPs